The Lancia 20 HP (Tipo 55), later renamed Lancia Gamma, is a passenger car produced by the Italian car manufacturer Lancia during 1910. It was derived from a previous Beta model, now equipped with a bigger engine. In total, 258 units were built. In 1911, the type was superseded by the larger-engined and more powerful Lancia 20-30 HP Delta.

The Delta was built with two wheelbases, normal and short. The latter was destined for competition-oriented Corsa models, to be bodied as open two- or three-seaters.

Specifications
The engine was a Tipo 55 side valve inline-four, with cast-iron monobloc engine. Bore and stroke measured , for a total displacement of 3460 cc. The engine produced 40 hp at 1500 rpm, giving the car a top speed of —the same as the six-cylinder Dialfa of two years earlier.

The transmission was a 4-speed gearbox with a multi-plate wet clutch.
The separate body was built on a conventional ladder frame; fore and aft there were solid axles, on semi-elliptic springs at the front and three-quarter elliptic springs at the rear. Braking was by drums on the transmission and on the rear wheels.

Notes

References

Bibliography

 
 

Gamma 20 HP
Cars introduced in 1910
Brass Era vehicles